Emilio Kovačić (born 11 January 1968 in Zadar) is a Croatian professional basketball scout and former player. At a height of 2.08 m (6'10) tall, he was a center with great rebounding skills and decent defensive abilities. He played for many years in the EuroLeague.

College career
Kovačić played American college basketball for the NAIA Grand Canyon Antelopes and Biola Eagles. He also played in the NCAA Division I team, the Arizona State Sun Devils.

Professional career
In his pro career, Kovačić played with Zadar, Zrinjevac, Fortitudo Bologna, Union Olimpija, and Cibona. He was named the MVP of the Krešimir Ćosić Cup (Croatian Cup) of the 1997–98 season, while a member of Zadar. In 2001, Kovačić has named the MVP of the Slovenian Cup finals.

National team career
Kovačić was a regular member of the senior men's Croatian national team. With Croatia, he won the bronze medal at the 1993 EuroBasket. He also played at the 1997 EuroBasket and at the 2001 EuroBasket.

Post-playing career
Kovačić was hired in June 2013, as an international scouting consultant for the NBA's Phoenix Suns. After five seasons, Kovačić was relieved from his position with the Suns on 8 October 2018.

References

External links 
Fibaeurope.com Profile
Euroleague.net Profile

1968 births
Living people
Arizona State Sun Devils men's basketball players
Biola Eagles men's basketball players
Croatian men's basketball players
Croatian basketball scouts
Croatian expatriate basketball people in the United States
Fortitudo Pallacanestro Bologna players
Grand Canyon Antelopes men's basketball players
KK Cibona players
KK Olimpija players
KK Zadar players
KK Zrinjevac players
National Basketball Association scouts from Europe
Phoenix Suns scouts
Basketball players from Zadar
Yugoslav men's basketball players
Centers (basketball)